Nguyễn Thị Trúc Mai (born 20 March 1997 in Tam Bình, Vĩnh Long Province) is a Vietnamese long jumper.

She finished sixth at the 2015 Southeast Asian Games, won the gold medal at the 2016 Asian Junior Championships, finished fourth at the 2017 Southeast Asian Games and eighth at the 2018 Asian Games.

Her personal best jump is 6.41 metres, achieved in July 2018 in Ho Chi Minh City, albeit without the wind information being registered.

References

1997 births
Living people
Vietnamese female long jumpers
Athletes (track and field) at the 2018 Asian Games
Asian Games competitors for Vietnam
21st-century Vietnamese women